George Henry Faber (10 December 1839 – 6 April 1910) was a British insurance underwriter and a Liberal Party politician.

Faber was born in Camberwell, and became a member of Willis, Faber and Company, of Cornhill, underwriters specialising in marine insurance. He was on the committee of Lloyd's of London, and The Times newspaper reported in 1906 that he might have been chairman of Lloyd's if he had wanted the post.

He was elected at the 1906 general election as the Member of Parliament (MP) for the borough of Boston in Lincolnshire, but did not stand again at the January 1910 election. He died in April 1910, aged 70.

References

External links 
 

1839 births
1910 deaths
Liberal Party (UK) MPs for English constituencies
UK MPs 1906–1910
Businesspeople in insurance
Insurance underwriters